The first pass effect (also known as first-pass metabolism or presystemic metabolism) is a phenomenon of drug metabolism at a specific location in the body which leads to a reduction in the concentration of the active drug, specifically when administered orally, before it reaches the site of action or systemic circulation. It is the fraction of drug lost during the process of absorption which is generally related to the liver and gut wall. The liver is the major site of first pass effect, it can also occur in the lungs, vasculature or other metabolically active tissues in the body. Notable drugs that experience a significant first-pass effect are buprenorphine, chlorpromazine, cimetidine, diazepam, ethanol (drinking alcohol), imipramine, insulin, lidocaine, midazolam, morphine, pethidine, propranolol, and tetrahydrocannabinol (THC).

First pass metabolism may occur in the liver (for propranolol, lidocaine, clomethiazole, and NTG) or in the gut (for benzylpenicillin and insulin).

After a drug is swallowed, it is absorbed by the digestive system and enters the hepatic portal system. It is carried through the portal vein into the liver before it reaches the rest of the body. The liver metabolizes many drugs, sometimes to such an extent that only a small amount of active drug emerges from the liver to the rest of the circulatory system. This first pass through the liver thus may greatly reduce the bioavailability of the drug.

An example of a drug where first pass metabolism is a complication and disadvantage is the antiviral drug, Remdesivir. Remdesivir cannot be orally administered because the entire dose would be trapped in the liver with little reaching the systemic circulation and reaching organs and cells affected by, for example, SARS-CoV-2. For this reason, Remdesivir is administered by IV infusion, bypassing the portal vein. However, significant hepatic extraction still occurs because of second pass metabolism, whereby a fraction of venous blood travels through the hepatic portal vein and hepatocytes.

The four primary systems that affect the first pass effect of a drug are the enzymes of the gastrointestinal lumen, gut wall enzymes, bacterial enzymes, and hepatic enzymes.

In drug design, drug candidates may have good druglikeness but fail on first-pass metabolism because it is biochemically selective.

Alternative routes of administration, such as insufflation, suppository, intravenous, intramuscular, inhalational aerosol, transdermal, or sublingual, avoid the first-pass effect because they allow drugs to be absorbed directly into the systemic circulation. 

Drugs with high first pass effect typically have a considerably higher oral dose than sublingual or parenteral dose. There is marked individual variation in the oral dose due to differences in the extent of first pass metabolism, frequently among several other factors. Oral bioavailability of many vulnerable drugs appears to be increased in patients with compromised liver function. Bioavailability is also increased if another drug competing for first pass metabolism enzymes is given concurrently (e.g., propranolol and chlorpromazine).

See also
 ADME, an acronym in pharmacokinetics and pharmacology standing for absorption, distribution, metabolism, and excretion
 Biopharmaceutics Classification System
 Drug
 Enteral administration
 Partition coefficient

References

External links
 National Library of Medicine, Toxicology Tutor II, Influence of Route of Exposure 
 Herman TF, Santos C. First Pass Effect. 2022 Sep 24. In: StatPearls [Internet]. Treasure Island (FL): StatPearls Publishing; 2022 Jan–. PMID: 31869143.

Pharmacokinetics
Medicinal chemistry